Swalpa Adjust Madkolli is a 2000 Indian Kannada-language comedy drama film directed by Kodlu Ramakrishna. The film features Ananth Nag, Ramkumar, Suhasini, Gurukiran and Shruti in the lead roles. The film had the musical score by Sadhu Kokila. The film is a remake of 1967 Tamil film Bama Vijayam.

Cast 
 Ananth Nag as Vasudeva Rao
 Ramkumar
 Suhasini
 Tara 
 Shruti
 Gurukiran 
 Ramakrishna
 Damini
 Chaithali
 H. G. Dattatreya
 Karibasavaiah
 Mandeep Roy

Soundtrack

The music of the film was composed by Sadhu Kokila.

References

External links 

 Hits n Misses

2000 films
2000s Kannada-language films
Indian drama films
Kannada remakes of Tamil films
Films directed by Kodlu Ramakrishna